Sri Rajagopalaswamy Temple, also referred to as Santhana Rajagopalaswamy Temple, is a Hindu temple in Rajamadam Village in the Indian state of Tamil Nadu. The deity came in dreams of King Serfoji II (Sarabhoji II Bhonsle) and blessed him with a male child. The king had been praying for an heir. To thank him the king built a temple along with a Madam and constructed Rajamadam village. This deity looks like Rajagopalaswamy of Mannargudi.

References 

Purana temples of Vishnu